Margit Dajka (13 October 1907 – 24 May 1986) was a Hungarian actress. She appeared in more than 60 films between 1932 and 1986. She starred in the 1976 film A Strange Role. It was entered into the 27th Berlin International Film Festival, where it won the Silver Bear. Her fourth and last husband was military officer Árpád Lajtos.

Selected filmography

  (1932) - Piri, Bognár felesége
 The Rakoczi March (1933) - Vilma, Jób lánya
 Modern Girls (1937) - Kati, cselédlány
  (1937) - Patkós Nagy Rózsi
  (1938) - Finum Rózsi
  (1938) - Zizus, utcalány
  (1938) - Lina, Péter elvált felesége
  (1938) - Anna, Benedek Péter felesége
  (1938) - Borcsa 
  (1939) - Iluska
  (1939) - Éva
  (1940) - Julcsa
  (1941)
  (1941) - Örzse
  (1942) - Hammer Milka
  (1943) - Éva
  (1943) - Bogár Cica - pesti dizõz
  (1955) - Camilla
  (1956) - Bakos néni
  (1958) - Nagymama
  (1958) - Racsákné
  (1959) - Sándor édesanyja
  (1960) - Fazekasné
  (1961) - Juli néni
  (1962) - Zágon felesége
  (1966) - Csohányné
  (1966) - Rhédeyné
  (1966) - Marika Anyja
  (1967) - Vass Mari
  (1967) - Házmesterné
  (1968) - Anna néni
  (1968) - Háziasszony
  (1969) - Mérges Franciska
  (1969) - özv. Széki Józsefné
  (1969) - Aranka
  (1969) - Piroska anyja
  (1970) - Nusi anyja
  (1971) - Majmunka
 Cats' Play (1972) - Anna néni
 141 Minutes from the Unfinished Sentence (1975) - Hupka
  (1975) - Treszka anyja
  (1976) - Dédmama
 A Strange Role (1976) - Öreg primadonna
  (1976) - Öreg primadonna
  (1978) - Zarkóczy Amálka
 A Nice Neighbor (1979) - Iduka
  (1979) - Oszkár mamája
  (1980) - Mom
  (1982) - Gyengusné

References

External links

1907 births
1986 deaths
Hungarian film actresses
People from Oradea
20th-century Hungarian actresses
Burials at Farkasréti Cemetery